The Institute of Space Technology (also known as IST) is a public university located in Islamabad, Pakistan. It is focused on the study of astronomy, aerospace engineering and astronautics.

Established in 2002 under the auspices of the Pakistan National Space Agency. IST offers a wide array of undergraduate and graduate degrees in partnership of Beihang University and University of Surrey. Since 2008, IST has an ISO certified management standard. IST is based on a 573 acre campus on the outskirts of Islamabad. It is one of the top institutions as ranked by the Higher Education Commission. Materials Inspection, Testing, and Characterization of Materials, a three-day workshop, was organised from March 8–10, 2022 at the Department of Materials Science and Engineering, (IST) Islamabad.

iCUBE-1

Institute of Space Technology on 21 November 2013, launched Pakistan's first Cubesat satellite, iCUBE-1, onboard Dnepr launch vehicle from Yasny launch base, Russia. Its transmitted signal can be heard on VHF band. It has a mass of 1.1 kg & has a volume of 10 cm cube, it houses several sensors to collect data for scientific purposes. iCUBE-1 is a fully autonomous satellite and is capable of maintaining its health via its on-board computer. iCUBE-1 will open up a wide range of future experiments that can be carried on Cubesat in the domain of imaging, microgravity, biology, nanotechnology, space dynamics, chemistry, space physics and various other fields. Cubesats can also provide a test bed for developing satellite constellations for specific applications.

Academics

Degree programs
The disciplines and the degree programs offered by IST have been given below. The regular duration of BS and MS / M Phil degree programs is 4 and 2 years, respectively.

Departments
At present, the institute holds the following Departments:
 Aeronautics & Astronautics
 Electrical Engineering
 Applied Mathematics & Statistics
 Materials Science & Engineering
 Mechanical Engineering
 Space Science
 National Centre for Remote-Sensing & Geo-Informatics
 Humanities & Sciences
 Avionics Engineering

Annual events 
IST Youth Carnival (IYC)
It was called as "All-Pakistan Inter University Challenge". IST has organized the Challenge every year for four years. The event attracts participation from the universities/degree awarding institutes/post-graduate colleges in the Rawalpindi/Islamabad area as well as from the cities of Taxila and Peshawar. The event includes over a dozen extracurricular competitions such as dramatics, short film, all-rounder, Mushaira and Battle of the Bands. Recently, the name of this event has now been replaced by IST Youth Carnival, or IYC.
World Space Week.
In 1999, the United Nations General Assembly declared 4–10 October as World Space Week. Pakistan is endeavoring to enter into the realm of Space Science & Technology and related applications. In past couple of decades IST has seen considerable advances in this field. The success of any space program relies greatly on public understanding and support. IST in collaboration with our National Space Agency (SUPARCO) is communicating the benefits of Space Technology to the public on regular basis. The institute has pioneered the observation of the International World Space Week in Pakistan. Walks, lectures and seminars are arranged in schools and colleges of the Twin-City area by students of IST. The week culminates with a full day variety show at the Institute that includes space quiz, poster competitions, space cinema and a musical concert.
IST Culture Fest
IST Culture fest is one of its kind two days event held at IST in June 2022. The event consisted of series of fun-filled and interesting events including Concert, Mushaira, Dramy-Bazian and Voice Alpha.

Extracurricular

Societies 
 ArtIST: promotes the spirit of Art among engineers by organizing  painting, sketching, rebel pen, truck art, craft exhibition & Visage Canvas competitions.
 IST Youth Club (IYC): IST YOUTH CLUB formerly known as Iqbal Youth Club is one of the most senior society of IST which deals with Ilm-o-adab and character building of the Youth. It covers all the national days of Pakistan by doing overwhelming events for the motivation of youth. Moreover, it also covers the competitions and events referred by Higher Education Commission (HEC). IYC is contributing its best to let the youth know about their culture and make themselves a worthy citizen.
 Hawks Adventure: It is the most famous and active adventure club of Islamabad.
 Aero Society: for students interested in hobby projects/research related to Aerospace.
 Communication Society: for students interested in hobby projects/research related to Communications,
 Material Advantage Chapter: for students interested in hobby projects/research related to Materials Science.
 IST Media Club: It consists of a team of photographers, graphic designers, video editors, programmers, digital artists, writers and social media experts whose job is to market and publicize the events and happening in IST.
 Pegasus: a bi-monthly, bilingual (English/Urdu) magazine that encourages students to hone their literary skills.
 News Corridor: campus newsletter covering happenings in the institution.
 Fidens: The Adventure Club - for outdoor enthusiasts.
 I4Gx : E-Gaming Society
 AOUJ: Performing Arts Club - for the promotion of drama, acting and dance.
 Sports Society: oversees the inter-university and intra-university sports fixtures.
 Umeed: a philanthropic organization that helps underprivileged students in the Twin-City area.
 Blood Donor Club: organizes an annual blood donation camp.
 Environmental Club: raises awareness and takes concrete measures for environmental protection.
 MATHEMA: The mathematics society of IST - Aims to provide enrichment and challenges for students of IST who demonstrate strong interest in mathematics. 
 SPAM: Student Magazine,
 Goonj: The Music Society - promotes music and music teaching. Arranges musical performances.
 Space Society:Promotes research and development in Astronautics, GIS, RS, Satellite Communication and Astronomy
Awaz: The Debating Society- promotes art of public speaking and communication skills of students
American Society of Mechanical Engineers (ASME) IST Chapter: Organize technical Competitions, lectures, seminars and workshops in related fields. Participation in intervarsity technical competitions.

See also 
 iCUBE-1
 Pakistan Remote Sensing Satellite
Space and Upper Atmosphere Research Commission (SUPARCO)

References

External links
IST official website

Educational institutions established in 2002
2002 establishments in Pakistan
Engineering universities and colleges in Pakistan
Public universities and colleges in Pakistan
Universities and colleges in Islamabad
Space technology research institutes